Hilbert is a suburb of Perth, Western Australia, located within the City of Armadale. This rural and semi-rural suburb is located on the city's fringe, and in the 2010s began to be subdivided for urban purposes.

The name was derived from the Hilbert family who were dairy farmers within the area. A road was proposed through Wilhelm Hermann (known as Herman or Harry) Hilbert's property in 1899, and in 1966 the unconstructed road reserve was named "Hilbert Road". There is also a large wetland in the locality generally referred to as the Hilbert Road Swamp.

The locality was formed from the suburb of Brookdale on 1 April 2008, and on 4 October 2011 the suburb's western boundary was amended to coincide with the centreline of Tonkin Highway.

References

External links

Suburbs of Perth, Western Australia
Suburbs in the City of Armadale